HIV-positive characters from television shows or made-for-television movie martin.

Notes

 
HIV